Irwin Lloyd Esler  (born 1957) is a New Zealand natural history teacher and former Invercargill City Councillor.

After studying botany at the University of Otago and education at Otago Polytechnic, Esler worked at the Otago Museum from 1978 to 1986. He then taught at the Southland Museum and Art Gallery from 1991 to 2001.

Esler unsuccessfully ran for Invercargill City Council in 1992, garnering only 3,641 votes and coming 26th. He made it onto the council in 2010 and rose up the ranks with each subsequent election, being the second highest polling councillor in 2016. Esler did not run for re-election in 2019, instead running for the Environment Southland council and topping the poll. He did not run for re-election in 2022.

Esler was awarded the Queen's Service Medal in the 2009 New Year Honours for services to the community.

References

1957 births
Living people
Invercargill City Councillors
Southland regional councillors
New Zealand educators
Recipients of the Queen's Service Medal